The Georgina Ice are a Junior ice hockey team based in Keswick, Ontario, Canada.  Starting with the 2016-17 season they play in the Provincial Junior Hockey League. Their prior league, the Central Ontario Junior C Hockey League of the Ontario Hockey Association amalgamated with the other Southern Ontario junior hockey leagues. It then became the Orr Division in the East conference.

History
The Ice were founded in 1994.  They have always played in the Central "C" league until the re-organization of junior "C" hockey in 2016-17 when the Ice became part of the Provincial Junior Hockey League (PJHL). The Ice play most of their home games at the Georgina Ice Palace in Keswick. Each year they play a handful of games in Sutton at the Sutton Arena.

The Georgina Ice have developed many young junior players that have risen to higher levels of hockey including Junior, College and professional leagues including the National Hockey League. The inaugural team saw players such as Jason Robinson, Jimmy Wilson and Todd Hamblin go on to play for the Stouffville Spirit of the Ontario Provincial Junior A Hockey League.

In the second year the franchise was affiliated with Stouffville Spirit over the course of their 13-year existence the Ice have also been affiliated with the 2002–03 Dudley Hewitt Cup and Royal Bank Cup winning Aurora Tigers. The Ice reformed their affiliation with the Newmarket Hurricanes in 2006.

In 2002–03 The Ice made the ultimate journey advancing to the Clarence Schmalz Cup. The Ice lost the series in 4 games to the Grimsby Peach Kings. Grimsby was making their first of two consecutive runs at the Ontario Championship.

2006 saw Ice alumnus David McIntyre drafted by the Dallas Stars in the 5th round of the NHL Entry Draft. Kyle Orr, also an Ice alumnus signed a pro contract with the Arizona Sundogs of the Central Hockey League. Justin Soryal, who played for the Ice in 2003–04, now plays for the Connecticut Whale in the American Hockey League.

In 2004, The Ice retired Jersey No. 94 in honor of all time Ice leading scorer Trevor Sedore who finished his junior career after 240 games with 179 goals and 172 assists for 351 points. Sedore was named league MVP 3 times in 7 seasons.

Also in 2004 the Georgina Ice honored longtime head coach Steve Sedore for his 25 years of coaching. He has been a constant fixture with the Ice over their 13 years. He was the head coach in the first season and has held various positions since. Steve is the longest serving and winningest coach in Ice History and has held coaching positions with the Stouffville Spirit, Couchiching Terriers and the Newmarket Hurricanes. He has also been involved in minor hockey with Georgina and York Simcoe.

Aside from Steve the Ice have been led by Mike Sedore, Paul Sinclair and Peter Hughes. Mike returned to the Ice in 2006 after Pete stepped down to assume the assistant coaching role. Mike last served as head coach in 1995–96 taking over for Steve when he took on the head coaching duties with the Spirit.

Heading into the 2006–07 Season the Ice have compiled a regular season record of 236-204-30-18. Since entering the league in 1994 they have played regular season games against the Port Perry Mojacks, Uxbridge Bruins, Lakefield Chiefs and Little Britain Merchants all of which remain in the league today. The Bowmanville Eagles left the COJCHL in 1995 and the Bobcaygeon Bullets left shortly after. For a period of time The Central League also played crossover games with the Empire B Junior C League.

In 2008 The Ice took home the coveted Cougar beating the No. 1 ranked Lakefield Chiefs 4 games to none to capture their second COJCHL title.

Captains

2020-2021:
2019-2020: Jesse King-Norris
2018-2019: Josh Lemmon
2017-2018: Justin Wain
2016-2017: Justin Wain
2015-2016: Bradley Boudreau
2014-2015: Brett Theissen
2013-2014: Luke Vanderkooy
2012-2013: Scott Sandercock
2011-2012: Scott Sedore
2010-2011: Braedon Collins
2009-2010: Brendan Berryman
2008-2009: Brock Van Der Gulik
2007-2008: Andrew Lamoureux

Season-by-season results

Schmalz Cup Finals appearances
2003: Grimsby Peach Kings defeated Georgina Ice 4-games-to-0

2017–2018 Team Staff
General Manager - steve Sedore
Assistant Manager - 
Head Coach - Steve Sedore
Assistant Coach -  Steve Knispel
Assistant Coach -  Mark Watson
Assistant Coach - 
Trainer - Amy Collett
Assistant Trainer -

2019-2020 Team Staff
President & General Manager - Joseph Cornacchia
Director of Hockey Operations - Michael Cornacchia
Assistant General Manager - Padraig Kenny
Head Coach - Mark Watson
Assistant Coach - Scott Sandercock
Equipment Manager - Brad Sedore
Trainer Donna Giancola

2020-2021 Team Staff
President - Joseph Cornacchia
Director of Hockey Operations - Michael Cornacchia
General Manager - Paul Dossey
Assistant General Manager - Padraig Kenny
Head Coach - Mark Watson
Assistant Coach - Scott Sandercock
Equipment Manager - Brad Sedore
Trainer - Donna Giancola

Home arena
The Georgina Ice Palace in Keswick has been the main home of the Georgina Ice since 1996–97 season. Prior to that the Ice played the bulk of their games at the Sutton Arena where they continue to play a handful of games each season.

The Ice Palace is located at 90 Wexford Drive just west of Woodbine Avenue in Keswick. It has a twin ice pad and also has a library, multi-use facility and a skatepark.

Notable alumni

 David McIntyre - Dallas Star Draft Pick - Minnesota Wild - Colgate (NCAA DI)
 Sean Walker - Los Angeles Kings - Bowling Green State University (NCAA DI)
 Justin Soryal - New York Rangers
 Joel Hanley - Dallas Stars - UMASS (Amherst) (NCAA DI)
 Brad Fogal - Adrian College (NCAA DIII) - ECHL - WPHL - AHL
 Taylor McCloy - Adrian College (NCAA DIII) - Norfolk Admirals - ECHL - SPHL

References

External links
Ice Webpage
PJHL Webpage

Ice hockey teams in Ontario
Georgina, Ontario
1994 establishments in Ontario